Ouangani is a commune in the French overseas department of Mayotte, in the Indian Ocean.

Geography

Climate
Ouangani has a tropical savanna climate (Köppen climate classification Aw).

References

Populated places in Mayotte
Communes of Mayotte